Astathes annamensis is a species of beetle in the family Cerambycidae. It was described by Breuning in 1956. It is known from Vietnam.

References

A
Beetles described in 1956